Edmund Brockman may refer to:

 Edmund Ralph Brockman (1828–1908), Australian politician
 Edmund Vernon Brockman (1882–1938), Australian politician

See also
 Edmund Drake-Brockman (1884–1949), Australian Army general